CyberGIS, or cyber geographic information science and systems, is an interdisciplinary field combining cyberinfrastructure, e-science, and geographic information science and systems (GIS). CyberGIS has a particular focus on computational and data-intensive geospatial problem-solving within various research and education domains. The need for GIS has extended beyond traditional forms of geographic analysis and study, which includes adapting to new sources and kinds of data, high-performance computing resources, and online platforms based on existing and emerging information networks. The name cyberGIS first appeared in Geographic Information Science literature in 2010. CyberGIS is characterized as digital geospatial ecosystems. These systems are developed and have evolved through heterogeneous computing environments (see CyberGIS Supercomputer below), as well as human communication and information environments. CyberGIS can be considered a new generation of geographic information systems (GIS). These systems are based on advanced computing and information infrastructure, which analyze and model geospatial data, providing computationally intensive spatial analysis, modeling, and collaborative geospatial problem-solving at previously unprecedented scales.

Further descriptions of CyberGIS include: "a fundamentally new software framework comprising a seamless integration of cyberinfrastructure, GIS, and spatial analysis/modeling capabilities", and a "GIS detached from the desktop and deployed on the web, with the associated issues of hardware, software, data storage, digital networks, people, training and education." Earlier scientific research demonstrated problems for integration of spatiotemporal data and analytics due to geographic and spatial complexity. CyberGIS attempts to move beyond traditional scientific and technical constraints within conventional GIS by innovating compute- and data-intensive cyber environments, exploiting spatiotemporal characteristics inherent in various scientific domains, and using big data and high-performance computing approaches to collaborative problem solving.

History 
In 2004, early research on middleware that integrates GIS with high performance and distributed computing technologies laid the foundation for the subsequent research and development of cyberGIS. This middleware was called geo-middleware because it was tailored to solving geographic problems. Geo-middleware was aimed at enabling collaborative problem-solving and decision-making by taking advantage of massive computational resources provided by high-performance computing infrastructure. Data-intensive spatiotemporal analytics and simulation require substantial computing power while geographic analysis often needs to address the effects of scale and spatial relationships have on various complex phenomena. This means that cyberGIS is focused on cutting-edge GIS advances that are dependent on advanced cyberinfrastructure and high-performance computing instead of conventional sequential computing and GIS approaches. By exploiting massive cyber resources, it is possible for cyberGIS to resolve broader scientific challenges through data-intensive spatiotemporal knowledge discovery.

The scientific cyberinfrastructure, geospatial, and GIS communities have been working extensively to advance the field of cyberGIS. A key community event was the National Science Foundation TeraGrid Workshop on cyberGIS that took place in conjunction with the University Consortium for Geographic Information Science Winter Meeting of February 2010. This workshop report laid out a compelling cyberGIS roadmap that articulates fundamental issues of cyberGIS for innovating cyberinfrastructure; at the same time, the report contributes to the advancement of the next-generation GIS, which integrates high performance computing, distributed computing, and Internet-enabled collaborative capabilities for geospatial discovery and innovation.

In 2010, Dr. Shaowen Wang described the first cyberGIS framework for the synthesis of cyberinfrastructure, GIS, and spatial analysis. Since then, it has been recognized as an important area for advanced cyberinfrastructure and GIS research. A multi-institution and multidisciplinary initiative, funded by the National Science Foundation in 2010, began a six-year $4.8 million project on “CyberGIS Software Integration for Sustained Geospatial Innovation.” This major initiative has established three interrelated pillars of a cutting-edge cyberGIS software environment: the CyberGIS Gateway, CyberGIS Toolkit, and GISolve middleware.

CyberGIS Supercomputer 
In 2014, the CyberGIS Center for Advanced Digital and Spatial Studies at the University of Illinois at Urbana-Champaign received a National Science Foundation major research instrumentation grant to establish ROGER as the first cyberGIS supercomputer. ROGER, hosted by the National Center for Supercomputing Applications, is optimized to deal with geospatial data and computation and is equipped with:
 approximately six petabytes of raw disk storage with high input/output bandwidth;
 solid-state drives for applications demanding high data-access performance;
 advanced graphics processing units for exploiting massive parallelism in geospatial computing;
 interactive visualization supported with a high-speed network and dynamically provisioned cloud computing resources.
CyberGIS software and tools integrate these system components to support a large number of users who are investigating scientific problems in areas spanning biosciences, engineering, geosciences, and social sciences.

International Conferences 
 The First International Conference on Space, Time, and CyberGIS
 The Second International Conference on CyberGIS and Geodesign
 The Third International Conference on CyberGIS and Geospatial Data Science

Scientific Organizations 
 CyberGIS Center for Advanced Digital and Spatial Studies
 National Center for Supercomputing Applications

See also 
 Computational science
 Data science
 High Performance Computing
 Spatial analysis
 Geography
 Information science

References

External links 

 What is cyberGIS?
 cyberGIS: The Next Frontier for GIS?
 cyberGIS: infrastructure for massive geospatial data, processes
 ROGER: The CyberGIS Supercomputer

Interdisciplinary subfields
 Web Geographic information systems